In 2005, the Scottish architecture magazine Prospect published a list of the 100 best modern Scottish buildings, as voted for by its readers.

See also
 DoCoMoMo Key Scottish Monuments

References

Architecture in Scotland
 
Lists of buildings and structures in Scotland
2005 in Scotland